Centropogon hirtiflorus is a species of plant in the family Campanulaceae.

Information
It is a plant unique to Ecuador.  Its natural habitat is subtropical or tropical moist montane forests. This species can be found in terrestrial systems. It is recorded that this species is endangered, but the threats that affected the population of the species is unknown. The habitat is occupied in the areas of low and high Andean forests.

References

Flora of Ecuador
hirtiflorus
Endangered plants
Taxonomy articles created by Polbot